The 1992 Minnesota Golden Gophers football team represented the University of Minnesota in the 1992 NCAA Division I-A football season. In their first year under head coach Jim Wacker, the Golden Gophers compiled a 2–9 record and were outscored by their opponents by a combined total of 313 to 200.

Offensive lineman Keith Ballard, defensive lineman Dennis Cappella and punter Dean Kaufman were named All-Big Ten second team.  Defensive back Justin Conzemius, wide receiver Omar Douglas, defensive lineman Shawn Ehrich, offensive lineman Chris Fowlkes, linebacker Peter Hiestand, defensive back Dan LiSanti, defensive back Jeff Rosga and linebacker Lance Wolkow were named Academic All-Big Ten.

Keith Ballard was awarded the Bronko Nagurski Award.  Running back Antonio Carter was awarded the Bruce Smith Award.  Dennis Cappella was awarded the Carl Eller Award.  Wide receiver Jon Lewis was winner of the Bobby Bell Award.  Linebacker Russ Heath was awarded the Butch Nash Award.  Running back Ken McClintock was awarded the Paul Giel Award.

Total attendance for the season was 227,446, which averaged out to 37,908 per game. The season high for attendance was against rival Iowa.

Schedule

Personnel

Season summary

Michigan

References

Minnesota
Minnesota Golden Gophers football seasons
Minnesota Golden Gophers football